The 2013–14 season was Malmö Redhawks's seventh consecutive season in the HockeyAllsvenskan, the second-highest league in the Swedish ice hockey system. The regular season began on 12 September 2013 away against IF Björklöven, and finished on 4 March 2014 home against Timrå IK. The team finished in first place in the regular season and thus qualified for play in the 2014 Kvalserien. The Redhawks finished in fourth place in Kvalserien, this means that the club stayed in HockeyAllsvenskan for the 2014–15 season.

Standings

2013–14 HockeyAllsvenskan season

2014 Kvalserien

Schedule and results

Preseason

Regular season

2014 Kvalserien

Malmö Redhawks qualified to the 2014 Kvalserien by finishing in first place in the regular season. The team last participated in the Kvalserien at the end of the 2007–08 season. The Redhawks will play the next season in HockeyAllsvenskan since the finished in fourth place in Kvalserien. The team won both matches against SHL team Örebro HK and fellow HockeyAllsvenskan team VIK Västerås HK, but lost both matches against HockeyAllsvenskan teams Rögle BK and Djurgårdens IF. They also won one of their matches against SHL team AIK.

Player stats
Updated as of end of season

Skaters
Note: GP = Games played; G = Goals; A = Assists; Pts = Points; +/- = Plus-minus; PIM = Penalty minutes

†Denotes player spent time with another team before joining Malmö Redhawks. Stats reflect time with the Redhawks only.
‡Denotes player was traded mid-season. Stats reflect time with the Redhawks only.
(G)Denotes goaltender.
Team PIM totals include bench infractions.

Goaltenders
Note: GPI = Games played in; MIN = Minutes played; GAA = Goals against average; W = Wins; L = Losses ; SO = Shutouts; SA = Shots against; GA = Goals against; SV% = Save percentage

Final roster

|}

References

Malmo
Malmö Redhawks seasons